This is a list of all genera, species and subspecies of the family Leptotyphlopidae, otherwise referred to as slender blind snakes, threadsnakes, or leptotyphlopids. It follows the taxonomy currently provided by ITIS, which is based on the continuing work of Dr. Roy McDiarmid.

 Leptotyphlops, Slender blind snakes
 Leptotyphlops affinis, Venezuela blind snake
 Leptotyphlops albifrons, Wagler's blind snake
 Leptotyphlops albipunctus
 Leptotyphlops albiventer
 Leptotyphlops anthracinus, Bailey's blind snake
 Leptotyphlops asbolepis
 Leptotyphlops australis, Freiberg's blind snake
 Leptotyphlops bicolor, Two-colored blind snake
 Leptotyphlops bilineatus, Two-lined blind snake
 Leptotyphlops blanfordii
 Leptotyphlops borapeliotes
 Leptotyphlops borrichianus, Degerbol's blind snake
 Leptotyphlops boulengeri, Manda flesh-pink blind snake
 Leptotyphlops brasiliensis, Brazilian blind snake
 Leptotyphlops bressoni, Michoacán slender blind snake
 Leptotyphlops brevicaudus
 Leptotyphlops brevissimus, Caqueta blind snake
 Leptotyphlops broadleyi
 Leptotyphlops burii, Arabian blind snake
 Leptotyphlops cairi, Cairo blind snake
 Leptotyphlops calypso
 Leptotyphlops carlae World's smallest snake
 Leptotyphlops collaris, Collared blind snake
 Leptotyphlops columbi, San Salvador blind snake
 Leptotyphlops conjunctus, Cape thread snake
 Leptotyphlops conjunctus conjunctus
 Leptotyphlops conjunctus incognitus
 Leptotyphlops conjunctus latirostris
 Leptotyphlops conjunctus lepezi
 Leptotyphlops cupinensis, Mata Grosso blind snake
 Leptotyphlops debilis, West African blind snake
 Leptotyphlops diaplocius, Common Peru blind snake
 Leptotyphlops dimidiatus, Dainty blind snake
 Leptotyphlops dissimilis, Sudan blind snake
 Leptotyphlops distanti, Distant's blind snake
 Leptotyphlops drewesi
 Leptotyphlops dugandi, Dugand's blind snake
 Leptotyphlops dulcis, Texas blind snake
 Leptotyphlops dulcis dissectus
 Leptotyphlops dulcis dulcis
 Leptotyphlops dulcis myopicus
 Leptotyphlops emini
 Leptotyphlops filiformis, Socotra Island blind snake
 Leptotyphlops fitzingeri
 Leptotyphlops gestri
 Leptotyphlops goudotii, Black blind snake
 Leptotyphlops goudotii ater
 Leptotyphlops goudotii goudotii
 Leptotyphlops goudotii magnamaculatus
 Leptotyphlops goudotii phenops
 Leptotyphlops gracilior, Slender thread snake
 Leptotyphlops guayaquilensis, Guayaquila blind snake
 Leptotyphlops hamulirostris
 Leptotyphlops humilis, Western threadsnake
 Leptotyphlops humilis boettgeri
 Leptotyphlops humilis cahuilae
 Leptotyphlops humilis dugesii
 Leptotyphlops humilis humilis
 Leptotyphlops humilis levitoni
 Leptotyphlops humilis lindsayi
 Leptotyphlops humilis segregus
 Leptotyphlops humilis tenuiculus
 Leptotyphlops humilis utahensis
 Leptotyphlops joshuai, Joshua's blind snake
 Leptotyphlops koppesi, Amaral's blind snake
 Leptotyphlops labialis, Damara thread snake
 Leptotyphlops leptepileptus
 Leptotyphlops longicaudus, Long-tailed thread snake
 Leptotyphlops macrolepis, Big-scaled blind snake
 Leptotyphlops macrops
 Leptotyphlops macrorhynchus, Longnosed worm snake
 Leptotyphlops macrurus, Boulenger's blind snake
 Leptotyphlops maximus, Giant blind snake
 Leptotyphlops melanotermus, Latin American blind snake
 Leptotyphlops melanurus, Dark blind snake
 Leptotyphlops munoai
 Leptotyphlops narirostris
 Leptotyphlops narirostris boueti
 Leptotyphlops narirostris narirostris
 Leptotyphlops nasalis, Taylor's blind snake
 Leptotyphlops natatrix, Gambia blind snake
 Leptotyphlops nicefori, Santander blind snake
 Leptotyphlops nigricans, Black thread snake
 Leptotyphlops nursii, Nurse's blind snake
 Leptotyphlops occidentalis, Western thread snake
 Leptotyphlops perreti
 Leptotyphlops peruvianus, Peru blind snake
 Leptotyphlops pyrites, Thomas' blind snake
 Leptotyphlops reticulatus, Reticulate blind snake
 Leptotyphlops rostratus, Bocage's blind snake
 Leptotyphlops rubrolineatus, Red-lined blind snake
 Leptotyphlops rufidorsus, Rose blind snake
 Leptotyphlops salgueiroi, Espírito Santo blind snake
 Leptotyphlops scutifrons, Peter's thread snake
 Leptotyphlops septemstriatus, Seven-striped blind snake
 Leptotyphlops signatus, South American blind snake
 Leptotyphlops striatulus
 Leptotyphlops subcrotillus, Klauber's blind snake
 Leptotyphlops sundewalli, Sundevalls worm snake
 Leptotyphlops teaguei, Northern blind snake
 Leptotyphlops telloi, Tello's thread snake
 Leptotyphlops tesselatus, Tschudi's blind snake
 Leptotyphlops tricolor, Three-colored blind snake
 Leptotyphlops undecimstriatus, Eleven-striped blind snake
 Leptotyphlops unguirostris, Southern blind snake
 Leptotyphlops variabilis
 Leptotyphlops vellardi
 Leptotyphlops weyrauchi, Argentine blind snake
 Leptotyphlops wilsoni, Wilson's blind snake
 Rhinoleptus, Villiers' blind snake
 Rhinoleptus koniagui, Villiers' blind snake

References

 
Leptotyphlopidae
Leptotyphlopidae